György Bródy (21 July 1908 in Budapest – 5 August 1967 in Johannesburg, South Africa) was a Hungarian water polo player.

Career
At the 1928 Summer Olympics he was a reserve player for the Hungarian water polo team, but did not compete in a match of the tournament.

He played an important role, however, in the 1932 and 1936 Summer Olympics.

In 1932 he was part of the Hungarian team which won the gold medal, playing two matches in the critical role of goalkeeper.

Bródy was Jewish; he was one of only around thirteen Jewish athletes who won medals at the Nazi Olympics in Berlin in 1936, with the number including six Hungarians.

Four years later, in 1936, he won the gold medal again with the Hungarian team at the Berlin Games. Playing a major role, he tended goal in six matches.  Many Hungarian Jews shared their fellow citizens' passion for sport and viewed participation as a means of assimilation. In the 1930s, however, the antisemitism of the fascist, pro-Nazi Hungarian government pervaded some fields of sport. In September of 1935, Nazi Germany passed the Nuremberg Laws, having boycotted Jewish businesses forcing many to close, the laws stripped Jews of their German citizenship, barred them from many professions such as theatre, law, and medicine, removed their right to vote or hold office, greatly limited their ability to attend public schools, Universities or obtain doctorates, and prevented them from being treated at Municipal hospitals.

Brody died on August 5, 1967 in Johannesburg, South Africa.

See also
 Hungary men's Olympic water polo team records and statistics
 List of Olympic champions in men's water polo
 List of Olympic medalists in water polo (men)
 List of men's Olympic water polo tournament goalkeepers
 List of select Jewish water polo players

References

External links
 

1908 births
1967 deaths
Hungarian male water polo players
Water polo goalkeepers
Water polo players at the 1928 Summer Olympics
Water polo players at the 1932 Summer Olympics
Water polo players at the 1936 Summer Olympics
Olympic gold medalists for Hungary in water polo
Hungarian Jews
Medalists at the 1936 Summer Olympics
Medalists at the 1932 Summer Olympics
Water polo players from Budapest